The 1933–34 season is FC Barcelona's 35th in existence. It covers the period from August 1, 1933 to July 31, 1934.

For the second year in a row, FC Barcelona ended the season without winning a title.

First-team squad

Transfers

In

Out

 (to Espanyol)
 (to Arenas)

Competitions

La Liga

League table

Results by round

Matches

Copa del Rey

Round of 32

Round of 16

Quarterfinals

Catalan football championship

League table

Matches

Results

References
BDFutbol
Webdelcule.com

FC Barcelona seasons
Barcelona